Tillandsia baileyi, commonly known as the reflexed airplant or Bailey's ball moss, is a species of bromeliad that is native to southern Texas in the United States and Tamaulipas in Mexico. It is found along the Gulf of Mexico from Kingsville, Texas to Tampico, Tamaulipas. Preferred host plants for this epiphyte include Southern live oak (Quercus virginiana) and Texas ebony (Ebenopsis ebano).

Cultivars
 Tillandsia 'Borumba' (T. baileyi 'Texas' × T. 'Druid')
 Tillandsia 'Califano' (T. baileyi × T. ionantha)
 Tillandsia 'Festubail' (T. festucoides × T. baileyi)
 Tillandsia 'Halley's Comet'
 Tillandsia 'Kanyan' (T. intermedia × T. baileyi)
 Tillandsia 'Mark Aldridge' (T. baileyi × T. capitata 'Maroon')
 Tillandsia 'Rosalie Mavrikas' (T. baileyi × T. schiediana)
 Tillandsia 'Tiaro' (T. baileyi × T. seleriana)
 Tillandsia 'Veronica Orozco' (T. baileyi × T. caput-medusae)
 Tillandsia 'Wallu' (T. baileyi × T. achyrostachys?)

See also
Vernon Orlando Bailey

References

baileyi
Flora of Tamaulipas
Flora of Texas
Endangered flora of the United States
Endangered biota of Mexico
Endangered flora of North America
Plants described in 1903